A Skeleton Key to Finnegans Wake is a 1944 work of literary criticism by mythologist Joseph Campbell and Henry Morton Robinson. The work gives both a general critical overview of Finnegans Wake and a detailed exegetical outline of the text.

According to Campbell and Robinson, Finnegans Wake is best interpreted in light of Giambattista Vico's philosophy, which holds that history proceeds in cycles and fails to achieve meaningful progress over time.

Campbell and Robinson began their analysis of Joyce's work because they had recognized in The Skin of Our Teeth (1942), the popular play by Thornton Wilder, an appropriation from Joyce's novel not only of themes but of plot and language as well. They published a pair of reviews-cum-denunciations of Skin of Our Teeth, both entitled "The Skin of Whose Teeth?" in The Saturday Review.

References

Sources

Further reading
 

1944 non-fiction books
Books by Joseph Campbell
Collaborative non-fiction books
English-language books
Works about Finnegans Wake
Books of literary criticism